Taungup or Toungup Township is a coastal township of Thandwe District in the Rakhine State of Myanmar. The administrative centre and principal town is Toungup.  The only other town is Ma-Ei.

Principle villages include: 

 Kan Pyin,
 Kyauk Seik Taung,
 Let Pan Kyun,
 Maung, 
 Moe Kyauk Gyi Kwin,
 Myo Taung Gyi,
 Nat Maw,
 Nga Lone Maw,
 Pa Dar,
 Sa Lu,
 Tar Ye,
 Taung,
 Thin Chi Kaing,
 Te Mauk, and
 Zee Kwin.
 kindoung
tayaba
kyepyin

Pauk Inn (Golden Hill  Village)

Pauk Inn Village(Golden Hill )

External links
 

Townships of Rakhine State